David Live is the first official live album by English musician David Bowie, originally released through RCA Records in 1974. The album was recorded in July of that year, on the initial leg of Bowie's Diamond Dogs Tour, at the Tower Theater in Upper Darby, Pennsylvania, a suburb of Philadelphia. The second leg, a more soul-oriented affair following recording sessions in Philadelphia for the bulk of Young Americans, would be renamed 'the Soul tour', as reflected on the live releases, Cracked Actor (Live Los Angeles '74) (2017) and I'm Only Dancing (The Soul Tour 74) (2020).

The album catches Bowie in transition from the Ziggy Stardust/Aladdin Sane glam-rock era of his career to the 'plastic soul' of Young Americans. While the cover featured a picture of Bowie in his latest soul threads – baggy trouser suit complete with shoulder pads and braces from October 1974 – the music was recorded in July of that year when he was showcasing his two most recent studio albums of original material, Diamond Dogs and Aladdin Sane, as well as selected favourites from Ziggy Stardust and earlier.

The tour was Bowie's most ambitious to date, featuring a giant set designed to evoke "Hunger City", the post-apocalyptic setting for Diamond Dogs, and his largest band, led by Michael Kamen. The tour was documented in Alan Yentob's Cracked Actor (1975).

In 2005, the album was re-issued with four additional tracks, after having been thoroughly remixed by Tony Visconti.

Background and recording

David Bowie supported his eighth studio album Diamond Dogs on the Diamond Dogs Tour, whose first leg lasted from 14 June to 20 July 1974. Co-designed and constructed by Chris Langhart, it featured elaborate set-pieces and cost $250,000. Fritz Lang's Metropolis (1927) and Robert Wiene's The Cabinet of Dr. Caligari (1920) influenced the tour's design, primarily due to Bowie's interest in German expressionism. The tour's second leg, from 2 September to 1 December 1974, has been nicknamed 'the Soul Tour', because of the influence of the soul music Bowie had begun recording for Young Americans in August. The shows were altered heavily, and no longer featured elaborate set-pieces, partly because Bowie had tired of the design and wanted to explore the new sound he was creating. Bowie dropped songs from the previous leg, while he added new ones—some from Young Americans.

Capturing the music on tape was itself problematic; most of the backing vocals, as well as the saxophone and the piano solo for "Aladdin Sane", needed to be overdubbed in the studio later because the performers were often off-mike. According to the original album's liner notes: "This Live album was culled from performances on the 14 and 15 July 1974 at the Tower Theatre, Philadelphia. It is complete and exact. No studio overdubs or re-recording of voices, instruments or audience have been added with the exception of several backing vocals due to loss of theatre mike contact." According to biographer Nicholas Pegg, there was a 'degree of confusion [that] surrounds the dates of the recordings, which are given incorrectly on some reissues: according to Tony Visconti the correct dates are 11 and 12 July 1974'. The Tower Theater concerts also gave rise to a backstage revolt by Bowie's touring band. Having been informed on short notice that the concerts would be professionally recorded for the official release and that Bowie's management intended to pay them only the standard union fee required for a live recording (a mere $70), the band confronted Bowie an hour before the first show and refused to take the stage unless they received $5,000 each.

The record is also notable for including Bowie's first release of "All the Young Dudes", a song originally given to the band Mott the Hoople for their 1972 album of the same name.

For "Space Oddity" (not released until the album's 2005 reissue) Bowie sang using a radio microphone disguised as a telephone whilst being raised and lowered above the stage by a cherry picker crane.

David Live was mixed at Electric Lady Studios in New York City in July, a month before the sessions for Young Americans commenced. According to a studio acetate auction in 2004, a working title was Wham Bam! Thank You Mam! [sic].

Reception and legacy 

David Live received primarily negative reviews from music critics on release. Writing for the New Musical Express, Charles Shaar Murray considered David Live to be an example of "outright artifice and self-parody", overall finding it uneven in quality. He nevertheless praised the rendition of "Rock 'n' Roll Suicide" as the finest performance of the song to date. Chris Charlesworth of Melody Maker was critical of Bowie's voice, calling it "hoarse, throaty and often off-key". In Creem, Lester Bangs wrote that without the proper visuals to accompany the music, the live album is a "dismal flatulence". Reviewing for the same magazine in January 1975, Robert A. Hull was more positive, finding it to be better than Diamond Dogs; he considered its major flaw to be the inclusion of too many tracks from that album, wishing he had included more tracks from The Man Who Sold the World and Pin Ups (1973). In The Village Voice, veteran critic Robert Christgau was very negative towards the album, stating "The artiste [is] at his laryngeal nadir, [the album is] mired in bullshit pessimism and arena-rock pandering — and the soul frills just make it worse."

Nevertheless, the album did attract several positive reviews. Robert Hilburn of the Los Angeles Times considered David Live an "essential" release, commending the reinterpretations of the songs and vocal performances. Reporting for the United Press International, Bruce Meyer considered David Live Bowie's finest record since Ziggy Stardust (1972), but noted that the artist's presence as a live act was not fully captured in the music alone. The Cincinnati Enquirers Jim Knippenberg likewise praised Bowie as a live act, calling the LP "excellent".

Retrospectively, David Live continues to receive mixed reactions. Reviewing for AllMusic, Stephen Thomas Erlewine gave David Live a mixed review. He gave praise to certain tracks, such as "Knock on Wood" and "All the Young Dudes", but overall concluded: "David Live is primarily of interest as a historical document, yet there's enough good material to make it worthwhile for fanatics." In a more positive review, Michael Idov of Pitchfork commended Bowie's vocal performance throughout the album, finding the version of "Rock 'n' Roll Suicide" to contain "arguably the all-time greatest display of Bowie's voice". Compared to Bowie's 1978 live album Stage, Idov described David Live as the "more genial album", preferring the former over the latter. Reviewing the album's 1990 reissue, Darryl Easlea of BBC Music commended the reissue, finding that it does the original album justice through the restored setlists and remastered sound quality. He gave immense praise to "Knock on Wood", "Sweet Thing", "The Jean Genie" and the previously unreleased "Space Oddity". However, he ultimately considered it and Stage "absolutely invaluable" as "complement[s] to the studio albums".

Mick Jagger commented about the album at the time, saying he thought "Knock on Wood" was "awful", stating: "If I got the kind of reviews that he got for that album, I would honestly never record again.  Never."

Bowie later commented that "David Live was the final death of Ziggy... And that photo on the cover. My God, it looks like I've just stepped out of the grave. That's actually how I felt. That record should have been called 'David Bowie Is Alive and Well and Living Only in Theory'".

Commercial performance
David Live made No. 2 on the UK charts (the tour had only visited North America), No. 5 in Canada (where the tour had opened) and No. 8 in the US. "Knock on Wood" was released as a single, reaching No. 10 in the UK.
A reissue of the album in 2005 finally included a complete song list from the original concerts plus a new mix by Tony Visconti, said to be an improvement over the fidelity of previous releases.

Reissues
This album was first released on CD in 1990 by Rykodisc/EMI, containing the bonus tracks "Time" and "Here Today, Gone Tomorrow", as well as Bowie's introduction to the audience of his band. A new version of the album was released on CD in 2005 by EMI/Virgin, containing two additional bonus tracks: "Panic in Detroit" (this version had previously been released as the B-side to the UK single release of "Knock on Wood", and reissued on the 1982 compilation Rare) and "Space Oddity", a reordering of these and previous bonus tracks into their correct position in the original setlist order, and a new mix by Tony Visconti.

In 2016, the album was included, in two versions, in the Who Can I Be Now? (1974–1976) box set.  One version contained the original mix and the same tracks that had appeared on the original vinyl album; the other replicated the 2005 version of the album in a new remastering. The latter was also released separately on CD and vinyl, in 2017.

Track listing

Original release

1990 Rykodisc/EMI

2005 EMI/Virgin

Personnel
According to the album's liner notes:
David Bowie – vocals
Earl Slick – guitar
Herbie Flowers – bass
Michael Kamen –  electric piano, Moog, oboe, arrangements, musical director
Tony Newman – drums
Pablo Rosario – percussion
David Sanborn – alto saxophone, flute
Richard Grando – baritone saxophone, flute
Mike Garson – piano, Mellotron
Gui Andrisano – backing vocals
Warren Peace – backing vocals

Charts

Certifications

References

Sources

External links

Albums produced by Tony Visconti
David Bowie live albums
1974 live albums
EMI Records live albums
Live glam rock albums
Rykodisc live albums
Virgin Records live albums
RCA Records live albums